Philippe Omar Troussier (born 21 March 1955) is a French former football player and now being a professional football manager who is the head coach of the Vietnam national football team.

After a modest playing career within the French leagues he moved into management where he started out within the lower echelons of French football, however it was his move to Ivorian team ASEC Mimosas where he started to distinguish himself as a manager after winning several league titles with them. This would soon see him have a long association with African football and particularly their national teams, with Ivory Coast, Nigeria, South Africa and Burkina Faso being teams he managed. His international management career would continue with Japan where he had a successful spell with them by winning the 2000 AFC Asian Cup, since then he has returned to club management.

Playing career
Philippe Troussier started his career in football as a player and would go on to become a professional with French Division 2 football club Angoulême in the 1976–77 league season. The following campaign he would leave to join Red Star 93, however his stay at the club was brief and he moved to Rouen. After several seasons with Rouen, Troussier's last professional club was Stade de Reims whom he played for until 1983. After having spent his whole professional career in the second division he moved into management.

Coaching career

Early coaching career
Troussier soon moved into management after gaining his coaching licences and achieved his first coaching position with the French Football Federation where he was allowed to manage a National football centre football club called Institut national du football de Vichy or more commonly known as INF Vichy. The team were allowed to participate in the third tier and given exemption from promotion or relegation so the young players could develop. In his time with the team he led them into the 1983–84 league season where they came second within their group. The following season Troussier would coach CS Alençon in the French fourth division and spent three seasons learning how to manage an amateur football club.

He would return to his former club Red Star 93 in the 1987–88 league season as their manager. In his time with the club he would guide them to second within the group and promotion to the second tier at the end of the 1988–89 league campaign. He would, however leave the club on 30 June 1989 to join second tier club Créteil on a caretaker basis until 1 October 1989 when Bernard Maligorne took on the management position.

Move to Africa
Troussier's first move away from France started with Ivory Coast top division football club ASEC Mimosas where in his debut season he won the league championship. This would soon be followed by two further league titles and an endearment towards the country, which saw him gain citizenship with Ivory Coast. With his impressive run at club level the Ivory Coast national football team hired him as their manager in hopes that he could replicate his success with the national team. He was assigned to qualify for the 1994 FIFA World Cup, however he failed to achieve this and soon left his post to move to South African football club Kaizer Chiefs.

After a brief period with Kaizer Chiefs Troussier moved to Moroccan football club Fath Union Sport and led them to the 1995 Coupe du Trône. His time with Fath Union Sport also saw him experience relegation to the second tier with them, however he remained with the club for several seasons until he was offered a chance to return to international management with Nigeria to replace Shaibu Amodu as they attempted to qualify for the 1998 FIFA World Cup. Entering the job halfway through qualifying he led them into four games throughout the campaign as Nigeria successfully qualified, however the Nigeria Football Federation decided to relieve Troussier of his duties and ultimately let highly experienced coach Bora Milutinović lead them into the tournament due to his experience of already managing three different nations in a World Cup at that time.

Troussier quickly found a new job managing another African nation in Burkina Faso where he was assigned to coach them in the 1998 African Cup of Nations, which they were hosting. In a short period of time he made the team genuine title contenders until they were beaten by Egypt 2-0 in the semi-finals. Burkina Faso ultimately finished fourth after losing to DR Congo in the third-place match, nevertheless the result meant it was their highest ever finish at the time. His stint at Burkina Faso would impress the South African Football Association, who offered him the job of leading South Africa to the 1998 World Cup. He would replace Jomo Sono, who, despite leading South Africa to the final of the 1998 African Cup of Nations as a caretaker manager, was not given a permanent position. Troussier, however was not able to galvanize the squad as he had done with Burkina Faso and the team were knocked-out in the group stages. After the tournament he would leave Africa, but before he did he was nicknamed as the "White Witch Doctor" for his overall successful legacy towards African football.

Move to Asia
In 1998 Troussier replaced Takeshi Okada to coach Japan and was assigned to improve upon the nation's previous results at the 1998 FIFA World Cup as they prepared to co-host the 2002 FIFA World Cup. Having to use a translator, he struggled to get what he wanted from the players as they were knocked out of the 1999 Copa América within the group stages. The disappointing performance within the tournament gathered a negative reaction from the Japanese media, which saw Troussier go for a more youthful approach and take the reins of the under-20 team as they participated in the 1999 FIFA World Youth Championship. The Japanese team had a successful campaign and were runners-up within the tournament. He continued to take control of Japan's youth teams when he managed the under-23 team in the 2000 Summer Olympics and led them to the quarter-finals. The majority of that team would then go on to be called up to the 2000 AFC Asian Cup and win the tournament. With this success, Troussier went into the 2002 FIFA World Cup with confidence and led Japan to the final 16, making it at the time Japan's best ever finish within the competition.

In July 2003 Troussier was appointed as the new manager of Qatar and was assigned with qualification for the 2004 AFC Asian Cup with the hope of repeating the success he previously had with Japan. Initially his reign went smoothly with a successful qualification campaign and a team selection that once again employed a youthful approach as well as several naturalized players. The tournament itself turned out to be a disappointment that saw Qatar finish bottom of their group. Along with his disappointing start to the 2006 FIFA World Cup qualification campaign, Troussier was ultimately fired from his position.

Return to France and Africa
On 27 November 2004, Troussier returned to France to manage Ligue 1 team Olympique de Marseille. His time with the club would see him have a tumultuous relationship with the senior players, particularly French international player Bixente Lizarazu. A fifth-place finish at the end of the season saw Troussier replaced by Jean Fernandez. He returned to Africa and became the head coach of the Moroccan national team, having taken over after the country's failure to qualify for the 2006 World Cup. However, he was fired after two months in charge by the Royal Moroccan Football Federation due to a difference in opinion.

Return to Asia
In March 2008, he returned to Japan to manage FC Ryūkyū a Japanese third-division team, before he was replaced by compatriot Jean Paul Rabier. Troussier would stay away from football and converted to Islam On 22 February 2010, he returned to management with Chinese Super League side Shenzhen Ruby F.C. on a three-year contract. He would once again enforce a youthful team selection; however this would relegate the team, making them the first top-tier champions to be relegated since the foundation of professional football in China. He would remain with the club while they were in the second tier; however after mounting criticism he would alienate himself from the fans after the fourth-round league match versus Chongqing F.C. when in a local TV interview Troussier fired out against criticism and doubt from fans and urged them "not to come to the game or him". Shenzhen Ruby won the match, however former players who were forced to leave by Troussier in his efforts to force youth into the team Li Fei and Chris Killen scored for Chongqing F.C. in their first return to Shenzhen and physical confrontations took place after the match among fans, staffs, players and even Troussier himself. He further alienated his relationships with the squad and staff on 25 August after a defeat to Chengdu Tiancheng F.C. saw the club's hopes of promotion vanish and he provided a statement that he would take leave back to France on a "regular holiday under his contract". The club's supporters would believe the board sent him on leave hoping that the indignity would see him resign rather than compensating him the 1 million euros per year in his contract. He returned from his holiday and managed the club throughout the 2013 Chinese league season, where he was unable to gain promotion.

Troussier is widely believed to be the first-choice replacement as coach of the Malaysia national football team after the Football Association of Malaysia didn't renew former coach K. Rajagopal's contract after it expired in December 2013. He was said to have agreed a MYR5 million annual salary with the FAM. However, the deal fell through when he faced some disagreements with the Football Association of Malaysia.

On 30 June 2014, Troussier became manager of CS Sfaxien of Tunisia. On 28 September 2014, Troussier quit CS Sfaxien.

In April 2018 he was one of 77 applicants for the vacant Cameroon national team job.

Later in 2018, he became a strategic adviser and then officially a technical director of PVF, a Vietnamese football academy. In 2019, referred by PVF, Philippe Troussier became the head coach of Vietnam U19 National Team.

Vietnam Football Federation has confirmed that Troussier is the new coach of the Vietnam national football team (as well as youth teams such as U22/U23 and Olympic team), succeeding Park Hang-seo.

Honors
ASEC Mimosas
 Côte d'Ivoire Premier Division: 1990, 1991, 1992

FUS Rabat
 Coupe du Trône: 1995

Japan
 FIFA Confederations Cup: runner-up 2001
 AFC Asian Cup: 2000

Individual
 AFC Coach of the Year: 2000
 Japan Football Hall of Fame: Inducted in 2020

References

External links

Philippe Troussier – International Matches as Coach at RSSSF

1955 births
Living people
French Muslims
Converts to Islam
Footballers from Paris
French football managers
Association football defenders
French footballers
Ligue 2 players
1998 FIFA World Cup managers
1999 Copa América managers
2000 AFC Asian Cup managers
2001 FIFA Confederations Cup managers
2002 FIFA World Cup managers
2004 AFC Asian Cup managers
AFC Asian Cup-winning managers
Angoulême Charente FC players
Red Star F.C. players
FC Rouen players
Stade de Reims players
INF Vichy managers
Red Star F.C. managers
CS Sfaxien managers
US Alençon managers
FC Ryukyu managers
US Créteil-Lusitanos managers
Ivory Coast national football team managers
Fath Union Sport managers
Kaizer Chiefs F.C. managers
Zhejiang Professional F.C. managers
Nigeria national football team managers
Burkina Faso national football team managers
South Africa national soccer team managers
Japan national football team managers
Morocco national football team managers
Qatar national football team managers
Vietnam national football team managers
Olympique de Marseille managers
French expatriate sportspeople in South Africa
Expatriate football managers in Japan
Expatriate football managers in Nigeria
Expatriate soccer managers in South Africa
Expatriate football managers in China
Ligue 1 managers
Shenzhen F.C. managers
1998 African Cup of Nations managers
French expatriate sportspeople in Ivory Coast
French expatriate sportspeople in Morocco
French expatriate sportspeople in Nigeria
French expatriates in Burkina Faso
French expatriate sportspeople in Japan
French expatriate sportspeople in Qatar
French expatriate sportspeople in Vietnam
Expatriate football managers in Tunisia
French expatriate sportspeople in Tunisia
Tunisian Ligue Professionnelle 1 managers
AS Choisy-le-Roi players